The Tanzanian shaggy rat (Dasymys sua) is a species of shaggy marsh rat endemic to eastern Tanzania, near the Uluguru Mountains.

Description 
Covered in soft, shaggy, reddish to brown fur. Broad shaped head with a short muzzle. Rounded ears with a distinct furriness to the interior. Tail is shorter than the head to body length.

Habitat 
Dasymys sua thrives in marshes and other wetlands.

Behavior 
Dasymys sua is nocturnal, similar to other members of its genus.

See also
List of mammals of Tanzania

References

Mammals described in 2003
Mammals of Tanzania
Dasymys